Tatjana Jurić (born February 10, 1982) is a Croatian television and radio presenter, and former model.

Jurić was born in Zagreb, and later moved to Milan to model.  In 2005, she joined the Exploziv television show on RTL Televizija.  In 2008, she became host of season one of Hrvatski Top Model, the Croatian version of America's Next Top Model.  She has also hosted Exkluziv s Tatjanom Jurić (Exclusive with Tatjana Jurić), and has hosted radio programs.   In 2011, she appeared as a contestant of Season 6 of Ples sa zvijezdama (the Croatian Dancing with the Stars).

She studied political science at the University of Zagreb.

References

Croatian female models
1982 births
Living people
Croatian television presenters
Models from Zagreb
University of Zagreb alumni
Croatian women television presenters
Television people from Zagreb